Paul Martin Brakefield FRS (born 31 May 1952, Woking) is a British evolutionary biologist and Professor of Zoology at the University of Cambridge, where he is also Fellow of Trinity College and until 2019 was director of the Museum of Zoology. He previously held the Chair in Evolutionary Biology at Leiden University in the Netherlands, and was President of the Linnean Society of London from 2015 to 2018. He is best known for his research on butterfly eyespots.

Career
In 1987 Brakefield became a Professor of Evolutionary Biology at Leiden University. In 2010 he left Leiden after serving as a professor for 23 years to become director of the Cambridge University Museum of Zoology. In 2011, Brakefield was elected a Fellow of Trinity College, Cambridge. On 22 May 2015 Brakefield became President of the Linnean Society of London, serving until May 2018.

Research
Brakefield works mostly with butterflies and insects. Amongst other topics his research focuses on eyespots on butterflies, especially Bicyclus anynana. The butterfly species Bicyclus brakefieldi is named after him.

Honours and awards
Brakefield was elected Fellow of the Royal Society in 2010. He was elected a foreign member of the Royal Netherlands Academy of Arts and Sciences in 2011. Brakefield was elected a member of the European Molecular Biology Organization in 2014.

References

1952 births
Living people
20th-century British zoologists
21st-century British zoologists
British evolutionary biologists
Fellows of the Royal Society
Fellows of Trinity College, Cambridge
Academic staff of Leiden University
Members of the European Molecular Biology Organization
Members of the Royal Netherlands Academy of Arts and Sciences
Presidents of the Linnean Society of London
People from Woking
Professors of Zoology (Cambridge)